Villers-les-Ormes is a former commune in the Indre department in central France. On 1 January 2016, it was merged into the commune of Saint-Maur.

Population

See also
Communes of the Indre department

References

Former communes of Indre